Art pop is a loosely defined style of pop music that draws on art theories and ideas from other forms of art.

The term may also refer to:

 Art Pop, a 2007 album by British rock band Githead
 Artpop, a 2013 album by American singer Lady Gaga
 "Artpop" (song), the album's title track

See also
Art into Pop
Art Pope
Avant-pop (disambiguation)
Pop art (disambiguation)